Karel Saitl (5 November 1924 – 9 January 2020) was a Czech weightlifter who competed for Czechoslovakia in the 1952 Summer Olympics.

References

1924 births
2020 deaths
Sportspeople from Brno
Czech male weightlifters
Olympic weightlifters of Czechoslovakia
Weightlifters at the 1952 Summer Olympics